Sausage Party is a 2016 adult computer-animated black comedy film directed by Conrad Vernon and Greg Tiernan and written by Kyle Hunter, Ariel Shaffir, Seth Rogen, and Evan Goldberg from a story by Rogen, Goldberg, and Jonah Hill.  The film follows an anthropomorphic sausage who lives in a supermarket and discovers the truth about what happens when groceries are purchased. He goes on a journey with his friends to escape their fate while also facing a lunatic and malicious douche who wants to kill him. 

The film's animation was handled by the Canada-based Nitrogen Studios. It is the first computer-animated film to be rated R by the Motion Picture Association of America. The film's rough cut premiered on March 14, 2016, at South by Southwest, followed by its general theatrical release in the United States on August 12, 2016, by Columbia Pictures.

The film received generally positive reviews from critics, who praised its animation, voice acting, and humor, though some criticized the large amount of swearing. It grossed $141.3 million against a budget of $19 million, becoming the highest-grossing R-rated animated film at the time until it was surpassed by Demon Slayer: Mugen Train in 2020.

Plot

Unbeknownst to humans, a supermarket called Shopwell's is filled with anthropomorphic grocery items that believe that the human shoppers are gods who take purchased groceries to a utopia known as the "Great Beyond". Among the store's groceries is a sausage named Frank, who dreams of living in the Great Beyond with his hot dog bun girlfriend Brenda and his friends Carl and Barry.

Frank and Brenda's packages are purchased by a female shopper. On their way out of the store, a returned jar of honey mustard tries to warn the groceries that the Great Beyond is not what it is said to be, but nobody listens except Frank. Before committing suicide by falling onto the shop floor, Honey Mustard tells Frank to seek out a bottle of liquor named Firewater. Honey Mustard's suicide creates an accidental cart collision that causes Frank, Brenda and several groceries to fall out of the cart, including a Jewish bagel named Sammy Bagel Jr., a Middle-Eastern lavash named Kareem Abdul Lavash, and a nasty and aggressive douche who, after his nozzle is bent on impact, swears revenge on Frank and Brenda.

Seeking to verify Honey Mustard's warning, Frank leads Brenda, Sammy and Lavash to the store's liquor aisle. There, he meets Firewater and learns that Firewater and his colleagues, the Non-Perishables, created the white lie of the Great Beyond to assuage the inhabitants' fear of being eaten. Frank vows to reveal the truth and is encouraged to travel beyond the store's freezer section to find proof, while Brenda, Sammy and Lavash are brought to the Mexican food aisle by a bottle of tequila, who is secretly working for Douche, until a lesbian taco named Teresa del Taco, who develops a crush on Brenda, helps them escape Douche.

Meanwhile, at the shopper’s house, Carl and Barry are horrified to see the shopper eat all of the foods. Carl spots a nearby open window, but is killed from being stabbed and sliced upwards by the shopper, leaving Barry to escape alone.

Barry then encounters a human drug addict, who becomes able to communicate with his groceries, one of them being Gum, a Stephen Hawking-like wad of chewing gum, after injecting himself with bath salts. However, the bath salts soon wear off and the addict prepares to cook Barry. The Addict accidentally burns himself and Barry yanks his shoelaces, making him slip and causing an axe to fall and decapitate him.

Frank's friends disapprove of his skepticism of the Great Beyond. He discovers a cookbook beyond the freezer section and reveals its contents to the store's inhabitants. They panic at first, but then shortly refuse to believe Frank until Barry, Gum, and the other groceries from the addict's home return with the addict's severed head, proving that the humans can be killed. The group drugs the human shoppers and employees with toothpicks laced with bath salts, whereupon an epic battle begins. Several humans are gruesomely killed while Douche takes control of Darren, the store manager (via a parody of Ratatouille). He confronts Frank about becoming a god now that he is in control of Darren and takes a bite out of Frank's torso. Brenda saves Frank as Barry and the other groceries catch Douche and Darren in a garbage pail strapped to propane tanks. They are then launched out of the store as the tanks explode, killing them both.

The inhabitants celebrate their victory with a massive orgy. Later, Frank and his friends visit Firewater, who had a psychedelic experience and discovered that their world is not what they think; they are merely animated characters voiced by famous actors in another dimension. Gum has constructed a portal to this dimension, and the group decide to travel there to confront their creators.

Voice cast

 Seth Rogen as Frank, a sausage who sets out to discover and expose the truth about the "Great Beyond".
 Michael Cera as Barry, a deformed sausage who is one of Frank's friends.
 Kristen Wiig as Brenda, a hot dog bun who is Frank's love interest.
 Edward Norton as Sammy Bagel Jr., a neurotic Jewish bagel who has an on-and-off rivalry with Lavash.
 David Krumholtz as Kareem Abdul Lavash, a Middle Eastern lavash who has an on-and-off rivalry with Sammy. He is implied to be Muslim as he desires 72 bottles of extra virgin olive oil.
 Salma Hayek as Teresa del Taco, a Mexican lesbian taco who is attracted to Brenda.
 Bill Hader as Firewater, an old Native American bottle of liquor and the leader of the Non-Perishables.
 Craig Robinson as Mr. Grits, an African-American box of grits and a member of the Non-Perishables. He has a grudge against crackers (a pun on the pejorative term).
 Nick Kroll as Douche, a nasty and foul-mouthed douche and Frank's arch-nemesis who seeks revenge on Frank for accidentally breaking his nozzle and preventing him from reaching the "Great Beyond".
 Scott Diggs Underwood as Gum, an intelligent paraplegic wad of chewed gum who wears glasses and has a mechanized wheelchair. He is a parody of Stephen Hawking. Underwood also voiced a gay Twinkie who is a member of the Non-Perishables.
 James Franco as Druggie, a drug addict who is the first human to discover the food's anthropomorphism after injecting himself with bath salts.
 Jonah Hill as Carl, a sausage who is friends with Frank and Barry.
 Anders Holm as Troy, a sausage who tends to taunt and bully Barry.
 Danny McBride as Honey Mustard, who is returned to his shelf upon the shopper mistaking him for regular mustard and tries to warn Frank and the other products of the reality of the "Great Beyond" before committing suicide.
 Paul Rudd as Darren, the manager of Shopwell's who is nicknamed the "Dark Lord" as he disposes of expired food and spilled items.

Production
Rogen has said that he worked for eight years to get the film made but the content worried most film studios. Noting that the film came from "an innocent place", Rogen stated that "'What would it be like if our food had feelings?' We very quickly realized that it would be fucked up." Goldberg revealed the project to Indiewire in July 2010, stating it was a "top secret super project". Initially, Indiewire was skeptical that the project was real and not a hoax on Goldberg's part, but after vetting, it did confirm that it was in the works. In November 2010, Hill independently confirmed to MTV News that he was working on an R-rated 3D animated film. Goldberg and executive producer James Weaver said that they had specific targets—Disney and Pixar films, which they have "ripped apart". Goldber said, "we're just kind of taking all the conventions of children's movies, and making them disgusting and insane".

The film was formally announced in September 2013 as a partnership between Sony Pictures, Annapurna Pictures, and Point Grey Pictures. On May 29, 2014, it was announced that the film would be released on June 3, 2016, but the release date was later revised to August 12, 2016. In January 2014, Rogen, Hill, James Franco and Kristen Wiig were announced as the leads in the film. The other cast includes Edward Norton, Michael Cera, David Krumholtz and Nick Kroll. On April 9, 2014, Salma Hayek was set to lend her voice to the film as Teresa the Taco. It was also announced that Paul Rudd, Danny McBride and Anders Holm would voice characters in the film.

When Seth Rogen originally submitted the film to the Motion Picture Association of America, they gave it an NC-17 rating due to the visibility of pubic hair on Lavash's scrotum during the climactic food orgy scene. Once said pubic hair was removed, the film received its final R rating for "strong crude sexual content, pervasive language and drug use". The film was granted a  certificate by France's film classification commission, which was criticized by Catholic groups in the country. The British Board of Film Classification classified the film at 15.

Work conditions
After the film's release, controversy emerged after anonymous comments attributed to the animators on a Cartoon Brew article suggested that the animators at Nitrogen Studios worked under poor conditions and were forced by co-director Greg Tiernan to work overtime for free. A total of 36 of the 83 animators were blacklisted and went uncredited in the film, believed to be due to their complaints; comments made in anonymous interviews by some of the animators involved in the project by Variety, The Washington Post, and The Hollywood Reporter alleged that the comments were accurate. All the animators in the film were reportedly told outright that they would be blacklisted if they did not work overtime without pay. In late March 2019, the British Columbia Employment Standards Branch ruled that workers were entitled to receive overtime pay for their work on the film.

Music

The film's score was composed by Alan Menken and Christopher Lennertz. The soundtrack was released on August 5, 2016, by Madison Gate Records and Sony Music Masterworks.

Track listing

Release
A rough cut of the film was shown at the South by Southwest Film Festival on March 14, 2016. The final cut of the film screened at Just for Laughs on July 30, 2016. It premiered one final time in Westwood before the film was theatrically released in the United States on August 12, 2016. The film was released in the United Kingdom on September 2, 2016.

Sausage Party was released by Sony Pictures Home Entertainment on Ultra HD Blu-ray, Blu-ray, DVD, and digital download on November 8, 2016.

Reception

Box office
Sausage Party grossed $97.7 million in North America and $42.8 million in other territories for a worldwide total of $141.3 million, against a budget of $19 million. The film was the highest-grossing R-rated animated film of all time, replacing South Park: Bigger, Longer & Uncut (which held the record for 17 years) and Aqua Teen Hunger Force Colon Movie Film for Theaters (which also held the record for 9 years), and made a net profit of $47.06 million, when factoring together all expenses and revenues, until it was surpassed in 2020 by Demon Slayer: Mugen Train, with an estimated $506,523,013.

In the United States and Canada, Sausage Party was released on August 12, 2016, alongside Pete's Dragon and Florence Foster Jenkins, and was initially projected to gross $15–20 million from 2,805 theaters in its opening weekend. However, after grossing $3.3 million from Thursday night previews (more than the $1.7 million made by Rogen's Neighbors 2: Sorority Rising in May) and $13.5 million on its first day, weekend projections were increased to $30–35 million. The film ended up grossing $33.6 million in its opening weekend, finishing second at the box office, behind Suicide Squad.

Outside North America, the biggest markets are the United Kingdom, Australia, Spain, Germany, Russia and Israel, where the film grossed $10.2 million, $6.8 million, $4.1 million, $3.5 million $2.6 million and $2 million respectively.

Critical response
On Rotten Tomatoes the film has an approval rating of 82% based on 239 reviews, with an average rating of 6.80/10. The site's critical consensus reads, "Sausage Party is definitely offensive, but backs up its enthusiastic profanity with an impressively high laugh-to-gag ratio – and a surprisingly thought-provoking storyline." On Metacritic, the film has a score of 66 out of 100, based on 39 critics, indicating "generally favorable reviews". Audiences polled by CinemaScore gave the film an average grade of "B" on an A+ to F scale.

Vince Mancini of Uproxx wrote that "Sausage Partys most charming quality is that it feels exactly like a group of 13-year-olds trying to entertain themselves, with excessive C-bombs and constant groan-worthy food puns." Richard Roeper gave the film three out of four stars, saying, "Despite all the cursing and envelope-pushing and bat-bleep crazy sexual stuff, Sausage Party isn't mean-spirited.  It's just... stupid. But also pretty smart. And funny as hell." Lindsey Bahr of Associated Press gave the film a positive review, writing, "There is no one out there making comedies quite like Rogen and Goldberg. They are putting their definitive stamp on the modern American comedy one decency-smashing double entendre at a time."

Accolades

Future
Rogen has expressed interests in making a sequel to Sausage Party and more animated films aimed for adults. When asked about the possibility of a sequel, Rogen stated: "It's something we talk about, yeah. That's one of the reasons why we took away the [original] ending because we thought, well, if that was the first scene of the next movie it's probably not what you would want it to be, with them just seeing us and finding us basically. But the idea of a live-action/animated movie, like a Who Framed Roger Rabbit?–style hybrid, is also very exciting, mostly because  is one of my favourite movies of all time."

Television series
In October 2022, Sausage Party: Foodtopia, a sequel series based on the film, was greenlit from Amazon Studios to produce 8 episodes with a 2024 release date, with most of the cast involved and co-produced by Sony Pictures Television, Annapurna Television, and Point Grey Pictures.

Video game
Frank and Brenda, the two main characters of the film, made guest appearances in the mobile fighting game Sausage Legend, released by Milkcorp for iOS and Android, as part of a limited special event that ran from March 6 through July 31, 2017.  As this game involves dueling with sausages, players in this game can unlock and control Brenda, who swings Frank around to battle other sausages.

See also

 List of adult animated films
 List of films that most frequently use the word "fuck"

References

External links

 
 
 

Gay-related films
2016 films
2010s English-language films
2016 computer-animated films
2010s American animated films
2016 black comedy films
2010s sex comedy films
2010s buddy comedy films
2016 LGBT-related films
2010s parody films
2010s fantasy comedy films
2010s comedy thriller films
Adult animated comedy films
American adult animated films
American computer-animated films
American sex comedy films
American black comedy films
American buddy comedy films
American comedy thriller films
American LGBT-related films
American fantasy comedy films
American parody films
Canadian adult animated films
Canadian animated feature films
Canadian computer-animated films
Canadian black comedy films
Canadian comedy thriller films
Canadian animated fantasy films
Canadian LGBT-related films
English-language Canadian films
Animated buddy films
American animated comedy films
Films directed by Conrad Vernon
Films directed by Greg Tiernan
Films produced by Conrad Vernon
Films produced by Megan Ellison
Films produced by Seth Rogen
Films with screenplays by Jonah Hill
Films with screenplays by Seth Rogen
Films scored by Alan Menken
Films scored by Christopher Lennertz
Films with live action and animation
Films with atheism-related themes
Films about food and drink
Films critical of religion
2016 controversies
2016 controversies in the United States
Film controversies
Film controversies in the United States
Film controversies in France
Rating controversies in film
Obscenity controversies in animation
Obscenity controversies in film
LGBT-related controversies in film
LGBT-related controversies in animation
Lesbian-related films
LGBT-related animated films
Annapurna Pictures films
Sony Pictures Animation films
Point Grey Pictures films
Columbia Pictures animated films
Columbia Pictures films
2016 directorial debut films
Canadian sex comedy films
Films produced by Evan Goldberg
Films with screenplays by Evan Goldberg
Self-reflexive films
2010s Canadian films